Big Sir is a fictional DC Comics character. He first appeared in The Flash #338 (October 1984).

Big Sir appears in the fourth season of The Flash, portrayed by Bill Goldberg.

Fictional character biography
Born Dufus P. Ratchett, he had a malformed brain gland that caused him to grow to incredible proportions but left him mentally handicapped. He was later abducted from his Central City Breedmore Mental Hospital home by the Rogues who equipped him with a high-tech suit of armor created by the Monitor. This suit was heavily armored, could fly, and included a powerful energy flail. However, it also made him susceptible to telepathic suggestion. Big Sir was told that the Flash had just beaten upon the Rogues Gallery and to make matters worse, he had hurt a mouse. Enraged, Big Sir ambushed the Flash who was at the time on trial in Central City for the murder of Professor Zoom. The dim-witted Sir managed to strike the Flash in the head with his energy flail causing the hero horrific facial injuries. With the last of his strength, Flash managed to run to Gorilla City, where his injuries were healed by Solovar and a simian medical team. Returning to Central City, the Flash managed to subdue Big Sir and took him back to Gorilla City where their super-science corrected his mental deficiencies. After his treatment, Ratchet's IQ was near genius level and he became a respected member of society.

Injustice League
When he returned as a part of the Injustice League, however, his intelligence had returned to its prior low levels. No explanation for this has ever been given. The team, led by Major Disaster, survived largely due to bizarre luck that often saved their lives and their freedom, but rarely their dignity.

Big Sir and his friends attempt to learn the French language but this ends badly because the Justice League Europe ended up being in the same class. A fight inevitably broke out. This involves Big Sir meeting his enemy's successor, Wally West.

Big Sir and Major Disaster by themselves broke the bank at the unofficial Club Justice League, leading, quite naturally, to much chaos and confusion. This confusion was further enhanced by the Club having been built on a sentient island, Kooey Kooey Kooey, who chose the time of the incident to go traveling.

The Injustice League even once became Justice League Antarctica. There, Big Sir encountered flesh-eating penguins and had his life saved by the canine Green Lantern, G'nort. The entire Antarctica base was destroyed in a battle with the flesh-eating penguins. Though the Justice League of America had to intervene, G'nort did save the lives of his teammates.

Around this time, Big Sir and the Injustice League participated in an attempt to con a cult leader out of his fortune.

After the fiasco with the Justice League Antarctica, he was fired by Maxwell Lord with full benefits and a month's pay, along with all his friends. This measure of respect prompted a visit to Max in Justice League of America #53, the first part of the Breakdowns crossover. Max was in the hospital after a brutal assassination attempt. There, Big Sir accidentally injured four police officers when he simply wanted to remove their guns. This, combined with a panicking nurse, caused the room to be surrounded by police, who believe Max to be in danger.

The Martian Manhunter uses his invisibility to spy on the group. He decided to leave them there, as he believed they would make perfect bodyguards.

Death
Big Sir later joined the Suicide Squad in return for a pardon, along with most of his Injustice League friends. They are sent in to deal with a terroristic/hostage situation on a small island owned by the country of Iceland. The problems stemmed from a mad scientist becoming personally obsessed with an evolutionary advanced life form. Big Sir encounters a genetically engineered biological form in shape of a small child. When he picks it up, thinking it is a real child, it explodes in his arms. He is killed instantly, but since other members of the team who were also thought to have been killed were later shown to have survived, it is still within possibility that Big Sir did as well, though he has not as yet made any further appearances.

Powers and abilities
Although Big Sir's strength levels would not be considered superhuman, he did possess raw physical power significantly greater than that of a normal human being. He has an electronic flail that emits spikes of pure energy or a steady stream of energy able to propel Ratchett through the air. Ratchett's helmet emits "telepathic noise" that makes Big Sir susceptible to suggestion.

In other media
A variation of Big Sir appears in the live-action television series The Flash, portrayed by Bill Goldberg. Introduced in the episode "The Elongated Knight Rises", David P. Ratchett is an inmate of Iron Heights Penitentiary nicknamed "Big Sir" with normal intelligence and no powers who was indebted to Henry Allen before saving his son Barry from the other inmates. In the following episode "Honey, I Shrunk Team Flash", Barry discovers Ratchett was framed by Sylbert Rundine and works with his friends at S.T.A.R. Labs to arrest Rundine and set Ratchett free. When Rundine refuses to cooperate, Barry runs Ratchett to Jiaju, China so the latter can live out his dream of living there.

Bibliography
 The Flash #338 (October 1984): "The Revenge of the Rogues"
 The Flash #339 (November 1984): "Warday"
 The Flash #340 (December 1984): "Reach Out and Waste Somebody"
 The Flash #341 (January 1985): "Trial and Tribulation"
 The Flash #342 (February 1985): "Smash-Up"
 Crisis on Infinite Earths #5 (August 1985): "Worlds in Limbo"
 Justice League International #23 (January 1989): "Gross Injustice"
 Justice League Europe #6 (September 1989): "No More Teachers' Dirty Looks...?!"
 Justice League America #34 (January 1990): "Club JLI"
 Justice League America #35 (February 1990): "Lifeboat"
 Justice League America #53 (August 1991): "Breakdowns Part 1"
 Justice League America Annual #4 (1990): "What's Black and White and Black and White and Bl"
 Justice League Quarterly #4 (Fall 1991): "The Sunnie Caper"
 Justice League Europe #49 (April 1993): "Red Winter 5: Hard Ground"
 Justice League Europe #50 (May 1993): "Red Winter 6: The Ice Breaks"
 Outsiders (vol. 2) #9 (July 1994): "Breakout"
 Suicide Squad (vol. 2) #1 (November 2001): "Almost a Good Idea" [Dies]

References

External links
 Big Sir at DC Comics Wiki
 Big Sir at Comic Vine
 Big Sir at Angelfire

Comics characters introduced in 1984
Characters created by Carmine Infantino
DC Comics supervillains
DC Comics metahumans
Flash (comics) characters